Michail Jurjevič Hraboŭski (Belarusian: Міхаіл Юр'евiч Грабоўскі; born 31 January 1984), better known as Mikhail Grabovski (Russian: Михаил Грабовский), is a German-born Belarusian professional ice hockey coach and former player.  Grabovski currently serves as an assistant coach for HC Dinamo Minsk in the Kontinental Hockey League (KHL).  Prior to his coaching career, Grabovski played as a centre in the National Hockey League (NHL) for 10 seasons.

Early life
Grabovski was born in Potsdam, East Germany, where his father, Yury, worked in construction for the Soviet military. The family returned to their native Belarus (then a Soviet Socialist Republic) when he was three years old.

Playing career
Grabovski was drafted by the Montreal Canadiens 150th overall in the 2004 NHL Entry Draft and played his first NHL game with Montreal on 6 January 2007 against the New York Rangers. He played three games in the NHL before being sent back down to Montreal's American Hockey League (AHL) affiliate, the Hamilton Bulldogs. He helped them win the Calder Cup as AHL champions in the 2006–07 season. Grabovski was called up to play in a few games with the Canadiens during the 2007–08 season but did not see much playing time due to his low position on the team's depth chart. Grabovski recorded his first NHL assist on 20 October 2007, against the Buffalo Sabres and his first goal two days later against the Boston Bruins.

On 3 July 2008, Grabovski was traded to the Toronto Maple Leafs in exchange for the draft rights to Greg Pateryn and a second-round pick in the 2010 NHL Entry Draft. As a 25-year-old, Grabovski went on to finish his first full season in Toronto with 20 goals and 48 points, leading all NHL Eastern Conference rookies in scoring. The Maple Leafs rewarded Grabovski for his rookie season performance by re-signing him to a three-year, $8.7 million contract carrying an average annual cap hit of $2.9 million. His 58 points in the 2010–11 season was the highest among Maple Leaf centres since Mats Sundin's 78 points in the 2007–08 season. On 6 March 2012, Toronto re-signed Grabovski to a five-year, $27.5 million contract carrying an average annual cap hit of $5.5 million.

On 25 September 2012, due to the 2012–13 NHL lockout that cancelled the first three months of the 2012–13 NHL season, Grabovski signed with CSKA Moscow of the Kontinental Hockey League (KHL). When NHL play returned, following a 2012–13 season in which he recorded only 9 goals and 16 points in 48 games, on 4 July 2013, Grabovski was unexpectedly placed on waivers and listed to be bought-out by the Maple Leafs.

On 23 August 2013, as a free agent following his buy-out, Grabovski signed a one-year, $3 million contract with the Washington Capitals. In his first regular season game with the Capitals on 1 October 2013, Grabovski scored a hat-trick in a 6–4 loss to the Chicago Blackhawks. Grabovski completed the 2013–14 season with a respectable 35 points in 58 games as the Capitals failed to reach the Stanley Cup playoffs for the first time in seven seasons.

On 2 July 2014, as a free agent, Grabovski signed a four-year, $20 million contract with the New York Islanders. His tenure with the Islanders was largely affected by injury, with a lingering concussion ruling him out for the entirety of the 2016–17 season. Grabovski joined the Islanders along with his Maple Leafs linemate and friend Nikolay Kulemin, making it known to teams during free agency that they wanted to sign together.

On 21 June 2017, the Vegas Golden Knights selected Jean-François Bérubé from the Islanders in the 2017 NHL Expansion Draft. Berube was selected with the condition that Grabovski's final year of contract be traded to the Golden Knights along with a first-round pick in the 2017 NHL Entry Draft, a second-round pick in the 2019 NHL Entry Draft and prospect Jake Bischoff. On 14 September 2017, Grabovski attended his physical for the Vegas Golden Knights with the desire to play for the team. However, he did not appear in a single game for the Golden Knights.

In June 2019, Grabovski announced his retirement, stating "I decided for myself that staying at home is not the best option. I need to do something. As a player I can no longer participate in games, so I want to try myself as a coach."

Coaching career
On June 15, 2019, Grabovski was announced as an assistant coach with HC Dinamo Minsk of the KHL.

Controversies
In March 2008, after being a healthy scratch for a game against the Phoenix Coyotes, Grabovski left the Montreal Canadiens and flew to Los Angeles to consult with his agent. The incident prompted his trade to the Toronto Maple Leafs that summer.

In January 2009, Grabovski was involved a scuffle with fellow Belarusian Sergei Kostitsyn during a game between the Maple Leafs and Canadiens. The two had been in a feud since Grabovski's days with the Canadiens. Prior to the 2010 Winter Olympics in Vancouver, the head of the Belarusian national hockey program had to intervene in order for the two players to be able to coexist on the same team.

On 19 February 2010, Grabovski was arrested in Vancouver after becoming involved in a street scuffle. He was out of the Maple Leafs lineup with a broken wrist at the time of the arrest and was in Vancouver attending the 2010 Winter Olympics. Court documents alleged that Dylan Richardson was punched in the face and knocked unconscious by Grabovski, who then assaulted Richardson's wife by also punching her in the face.

Grabovski inadvertently ended Chris Pronger's career when he accidentally hit him in the side of the eye with his stick.

On 9 February 2013, Grabovski was accused of biting Max Pacioretty of the Montreal Canadiens during a scrum along the boards. The NHL conducted a telephone hearing with the players involved, but could not determine conclusively if Grabovski had indeed bitten Pacioretty. However, on 20 May 2013, more than three months later, Grabovski admitted that he did bite Pacioretty, stating in an interview, "He was choking me and I bit him. Don't stick your hands where you shouldn't."

On 3 July 2013, after learning that his contract was being bought-out by the Toronto Maple Leafs, Grabovski was very critical of Toronto's head coach at the time, Randy Carlyle, in an expletive-filled interview with TSN. "I play in the fucking Russian KHL, I make lots of fucking points and what's going to happen? He make me fucking play on the fourth line and he put me in the playoffs on the fourth line and third line again," said Grabovski. "I don't feel any support from this fucking idiot."

Some controversy on Grabovski's nationality was discussed on the 7 February 2020 edition of the Toronto-based OverDrive sports radio show. Grabovski is known to be Belarusian despite the fact he was born in Germany; hosts Brian Hayes and Jeff O'Neill debated whether he should be considered of German descent, in regards to how many German nationals have played for the Toronto Maple Leafs. For the sake of the argument, Grabovski is indeed Belarusian, and should not be considered German.

International play

Grabovski has represented Belarus in international play. He scored four goals and was the first star in one game (against tournament hosts Austria) in the 2005 IIHF World Championship. Grabovski was selected to play for his country at the 2010 Winter Olympics in Vancouver. However, he did not play due to injury. However, a few months later, he participated in the 2010 IIHF World Championship for Belarus. Grabovski was named captain of Belarus's roster on the eve of 2011 IIHF World Championship in Slovakia. In total, Grabovski has played in seven major international tournaments for Belarus.

Personal life
Grabovski and his wife Kate Van Alstyne had their first child, a daughter, on 30 December 2010. He missed the Maple Leafs' game against the Columbus Blue Jackets that night to be present at the birth. They had their second child, a son, on 6 December 2011. Grabovski and his wife called their son Jagger after The Rolling Stones frontman Mick Jagger. A third child was born 13 December 2017.

Career statistics

Regular season and playoffs

International

References

External links
 

1984 births
Belarusian expatriate sportspeople in Canada
Belarusian ice hockey centres
Expatriate ice hockey players in Russia
Hamilton Bulldogs (AHL) players
HC Dynamo Moscow players
HC Neftekhimik Nizhnekamsk players
Living people
Montreal Canadiens draft picks
Montreal Canadiens players
New York Islanders players
Sportspeople from Potsdam
Toronto Maple Leafs players
Washington Capitals players
Belarusian expatriate sportspeople in Russia
Belarusian expatriate sportspeople in the United States
Expatriate ice hockey players in Canada
Expatriate ice hockey players in the United States
Belarusian expatriate ice hockey people